Qez Qaleh (also Romanized as Qez Qal‘eh) is a village in Mokriyan-e Shomali Rural District, in the Central District of Miandoab County, West Azerbaijan Province, Iran. At the 2006 census, its population was 490, in 113 families.

References 

Populated places in Miandoab County